Marie Brandolini d'Adda di Valmareno (née Angliviel de la Beaumelle; 7 April 1963 – 30 May 2013) was a French-Italian glass maker.

Early life and family 
Marie Angliviel de la Beaumelle was born on April 7, 1963, in Neuilly-sur-Seine, Hauts-de-Seine. Her father was Armand Angliviel de la Beaumelle, a member of a prominent haute bourgeois family from Languedoc, and her mother was Baroness Béatrice Juliette Ruth de Rothschild, a member of the aristocratic Rothschild family. Her maternal grandfather was Baron Alain de Rothschild. On her father's side she is a distant relation to Laurent Angliviel de la Beaumelle. After her father died, her mother remarried Pierre Rosenberg in 1981.

Adult life 
She married Brandino Brandolini d'Adda, the son of Brandolino Brandolini d'Adda, Conte di Valmareno and Cristiana Agnelli, in November 1987 in Paris. The couple had three sons: Guido, Marcantonio, and Gioacchino. They resided in the Palazzo Brandolini on the Grand Canal in Venice and at Vistorta, a family estate in Friuli.

Angliviel de la Beaumelle worked as a contemporary glass designer in Venice, founding the company Laguna~B in 1994. She also served as the president of the French Alliance of Venice, which promoted French culture in Italy. She was also a patron of the Murano Glass Museum and the Fondazione Musei Civici di Venezia. She has discussed the process she uses to make glass art in the media, including in Architectural Digest.

Death 
She died from cancer on 30 May 2013.
She was given a Catholic funeral at the Church of the Transfiguration of Jesus in Vistorta. After her death, the Mayor of Venice, Giorgio Orsoni, offered his condolences to the Brandolini d'Adda family and referred to Angliviel de la Beaumelle as "a friend of Venice, a tireless animator of the cultural and artistic life of the Lagoon." Upon her death, her son Marcantonio took over the company Laguna~B.

References

External links
 Laguna B website

1963 births
2013 deaths
20th-century French women artists
21st-century French women artists
Deaths from cancer in Italy
French people of Jewish descent
French women company founders
French nobility
French socialites
Italian countesses
Italian socialites
Glass makers
People from Neuilly-sur-Seine
Marie
Brandolini d'Adda family
Rothschild family